Stand Strong Aotearoa is a compilation album released in 1991 by recording label, Festival Music.

Track listing
 "Can't Control Her" – These Wilding Ways
 "Two Feet Off the Ground" – Greg Johnson Set
 "Red Letter" – Charlotte Sometimes
 "Cruise Control" – Headless Chickens
 "Paint My Heart" – World Gone Wild
 "Body Rhymes (Protect Yourself)" – MC OJ and Rhythm Slave
 "Roseanne" – Scarf
 "Down in Splendour" – Straitjacket Fits
 "Terrified" – Emulsifier
 "Song 27" – Push Push
 "Turn It Around" – Ngaire
 "Crying Shame" – Six Volts
 "A.E.I.O.U. (Akona Te Reo)" – Moana and the Moahunters
 "Looking For the Real Thing" – Parker Project
 "The Black and the Blue" – The Bats
 "So Glad" – Smokeshop
 "It" – Shihad

Compilation albums by New Zealand artists
1991 compilation albums
Rock compilation albums
Festival Records compilation albums